Below are the player squads of the teams participating in the 1991 CONCACAF Gold Cup.

Group A

Canada
Head coach:  Tony Waiters

Honduras
Head coach:  Flavio Ortega

Jamaica
Head coach: Carl Brown

Mexico
Head coach: Manuel Lapuente

Group B

Costa Rica
Head coach:  Rolando Villalobos

Guatemala
Head coach:  Haroldo Cordón

(N°7)Byron Guerrera DF //19 Aduana Central Guatemala
(N°12)Leonel Contreras DF / /19 Tipografia Nacional Guatemala
(N°13)Carlos Mendez MF / /19 Tipografia Nacional Guatemala
(N°15)Jose Jorge Anibal Vargas FW / /19 Juventud Copalera Guatemala
(N°18)Ronald Remis DF / /19 Club Social y Deportivo Galcasa Guatemala

Trinidad and Tobago
Head coach:  Edgar Vidale

1

|caps=|club=Maryland Bays|clubnat=USA}}
|caps=|club=|clubnat=}}
|caps=|club=|clubnat=}}

(N°3)Kirk Solomon DF / /19 Trinidad and Tobago                                                                                                                                                                                                                                   
(N°4)Larry Joseph DF / /19 Triidad and Tobago                                                                                                                                                                                                                         
(N°9)Dexter Hayden Skeene FW 01/04/1964 Trinidad and Tobago
(N°20)Bryan Haynes MF 07/05/1962 Maryland Bays United States of America

United States
Head coach:  Bora Milutinović

References

CONCACAF Gold Cup squads
Squads